Rumarz or Rumorz or Roomarz may refer to:
 Rumarz-e Olya
 Rumarz-e Sofla